Elisabeth “Liz” Prueitt is a pastry chef and along with her husband Chad Robertson, the owner of the San Francisco bakery chain Tartine.

She has been described as both a “brilliant pastry chef” and a “pastry prodigy.”

Early life 
Elisabeth Prueitt is native of Park Slope, Brooklyn. 

Prueitt first studied acting, then photojournalism, then enrolled in the Culinary Institute of America's chef’s training program (not pastry), then interned and line-cooked at Montrachet, in NYC, then returned to the Culinary Institute of America.

Prueitt graduated from The Culinary Institute of America in Hyde Park, New York. Prueitt and Robertson met at the CIA.

Prueitt was enrolled in the Culinary Institute of America's baking and pastry program. 

At 20, Robertson, from West Texas, smelled bread from Richard Bourdon's Berkshire Mountain Bakery in Housatonic, Massachusetts, who referred Robertson to Patrick Le Port, of Savoie.

In 1994, Prueitt and Robertson traveled to, and worked through, France, learning from Daniel Collin (in Provence) and Patrick Le Port (in Savoie).

Career
Prueitt and Chad Robertson, ran the Wood-Fire Baking in Point Reyes and Bay Village Breads in Mill Valley.

Robertson and Prueitt then opened their first Tartine location in 2002. Bar Tartine, and in 2011, Tartine Sandwich followed.

Personal life
Prueitt went into premature labor, and their daughter was diagnosed with cerebral palsy.

Prueitt was a co-founder of Productive Learning Center of San Francisco. The school for children with motor disabilities is a non profit.

Awards and honors
 James Beard Award Best pastry chef.

References

Living people
Year of birth missing (living people)
Pastry chefs
Culinary Institute of America Hyde Park alumni
American women chefs
Chefs from New York City
People from Brooklyn
James Beard Foundation Award winners